Four-in-a-row (or four-in-a-line) is the name for several games in which the object is to line up four things in a row. Some of these games are:

 Connect Four
 Score Four
 3-D Tic-Tac-Toe
 Kaplansky's game
 Quarto (board game)
 Gobblet

See also 
 Pixel (board game) : Four-in-a-row for 2 or 3 players, three-in-a-row for 4 players.

In-a-row games